Aayat is an Indian film song from the soundtrack of the music album of Bajirao Mastani. The usage of the word "Aayat" in the song is to describe Bajirao's love for Mastani by saying I remember you like "Aayat" from Bajirao to Mastani. The song is sung by Arijit Singh and the Qawwali vocals are provided by Mujtaba Aziz Naza, Shadab Faridi, Altamash Faridi and Farhan Sabri. It is composed by filmmaker and music composer Sanjay Leela Bhansali, and the lyrics are penned by A. M. Turaz with Qawwali lyrics by Nasir Faraaz. The music video of the song is picturised upon actress Deepika Padukone (Mastani) and actor Ranveer Singh (Bajirao).

Critical reception
Suanshu Khurana of The Indian Express wrote "Arijit Singh's "Aayat", with a strong ghazal and minimum orchestration, gets Singh's voice to shine. There is a qawwali digression, which works well".

Accolades

References

2015 songs
Hindi film songs
Indian classical music
Qawwali
Arijit Singh songs